The counting lemmas this article discusses are statements in combinatorics and graph theory.

Graph embedding version of counting lemma 
Whenever we have an -regular pair of subsets of vertices  in a graph , we can interpret this in the following way: the bipartite graph, which has density , is close to being a random bipartite graph in which every edge appears with probability , with some  error.

In a setting where we have several clusters of vertices, some of the pairs between these clusters being -regular, we would expect the count of small, or local patterns, to be roughly equal to the count of such patterns in a random graph.

Being more careful of these details, the statement of the graph counting lemma is as follows: Statement of the theorem 
This theorem is a generalization of the triangle counting lemma, which states the above but with : Triangle counting Lemma 

Proof of triangle counting lemma: 

From there we can conclude this proof.

Graphon version of counting lemma 

The space  of graphons is given the structure of a metric space where the metric is the cut distance . The following lemma is an important step in order to prove that  is a compact metric space. Intuitively, it says that for a graph , the homomorphism densities of two graphons with respect to this graph have to be close  (this bound depending on the number of edges ) if the graphons are close in terms of cut distance.

Definition (cut norm). 

Definition (cut distance). 
Graphon Counting Lemma 
For graphons  and graph , we have , where  denotes the number of edges of graph .

Proof of the graphon counting lemma:

Step 1: Reformulation. We prove a reformulation of the cut norm, which is by definition the left hand side of the following equality. The supremum in the right hand side is taken among measurable functions  and :

In the case that , we observe that

Step 3: General case. For a general graph , we need the following lemma to make everything more convenient: Lemma. 
The following expression holds:
The above lemma follows from a straightforward expansion of the right hand side. Then, by the triangle inequality of norm, we have the following

This finishes the proof.

See also
 Graph removal lemma

References 

Lemmas
Combinatorics
Graph theory